The 1942 football season was São Paulo's 13th season since the club's founding in 1930.

Overall

{|class="wikitable"
|-
|Games played || 34 (20 Campeonato Paulista, 14 Friendly match)
|-
|Games won || 19 (15 Campeonato Paulista, 4 Friendly match)
|-
|Games drawn || 7 (2 Campeonato Paulista, 5 Friendly match)
|-
|Games lost || 8 (3 Campeonato Paulista, 5 Friendly match)
|-
|Goals scored || 104
|-
|Goals conceded || 52
|-
|Goal difference || +52
|-
|Best result || 8–1 (H) v Ypiranga - Campeonato Paulista - 1942.08.21
|-
|Worst result || 1–3 (A) v Fluminense - Friendly match - 1942.10.31  1–3 (A) v Palmeiras - Campeonato Paulista - 1942.09.20
|-
|Most appearances || 
|-
|Top scorer || 
|-

Friendlies

Torneio Quinela de Ouro

Official competitions

Campeonato Paulista

Record

External links
official website 

Association football clubs 1942 season
1942
1942 in Brazilian football